The 1986–87 1. Slovenská národná hokejová liga season was the 18th season of the 1. Slovenská národná hokejová liga, the second level of ice hockey in Czechoslovakia alongside the 1. Česká národní hokejová liga. 12 teams participated in the league, and TJ Plastika Nitra won the championship. Slávia Ekonóm Bratislava was relegated.

Regular season

References

External links
 Season on avlh.sweb.cz (PDF)
 Season on hokejpoprad.sk

Czech
1st. Slovak National Hockey League seasons
2